The Hoollongapar Gibbon Sanctuary in Assam, India is an isolated protected area of evergreen forest with rich biodiversity.

Flora
Several species of cane and more than a hundred species of herb, shrub, undershrub, lianas, bamboo and grass can be found at the Hoollongapar Gibbon Sanctuary.

Some important climbers of the sanctuary are:

Fauna

Mammals

Reptiles

Birds

References

Hoollongapar Gibbon Sanctuary